The four-man bobsleigh results at the 1948 Winter Olympics in St. Moritz, Switzerland. The competition was held on Friday and Saturday, 6 and 7 February 1948.

Medal table

Results

The competition was halted in the middle of the second round when a water pipe burst, flooding the bobrun.

References

External links
Official Olympic Report
De Wael results for 1948
1948 bobsleigh four-man results
Wallechinsky, David and Jaime Loucky (2009). "Bobsleigh: Four-Man". In The Complete Book of the Winter Olympics: 2010 Edition. London: Aurum Press Limited. p. 162.

Bobsleigh at the 1948 Winter Olympics